The 1945–46 season was Real Madrid Club de Fútbol's 43rd season in existence and the club's 14th consecutive season in the top flight of Spanish football.

Summary
Under the management of Jacinto Quincoces, the club finished on a decent 4th spot in the league, five points below champions Sevilla CF. The squad also reached the 1946 Copa del Generalísimo Final after defeating Alcoyano and clinched its eighth cup title with a victory over Valencia CF, thanks to a Pruden brace and a goal from Sabino Barinaga.

Squad

Transfers

Competitions

La Liga

Position by round

League table

Matches

Copa del Generalísimo

Statistics

Squad statistics

Players statistics

References

Real Madrid CF seasons
Real Madrid CF